Aspley Heath is a village and civil parish in the Central Bedfordshire district of Bedfordshire, England, elevated and small in population and area, mostly covered by New Wavendon Heath and a smaller mixed eponymous woodland.  It was until some time after 1912 part of Aspley Guise. The Office for National Statistics records the village as part of the Woburn Sands urban subdivision of the Milton Keynes urban area. In addition to the village of Aspley Heath itself, the civil parish also includes part of the town of Woburn Sands, the rest of which is in the City of Milton Keynes in Buckinghamshire.

The village borders Aspley Guise to the northeast, Woburn to the south, and the CP of Woburn Sands, to the north and northwest, which is in the City of Milton Keynes in Buckinghamshire.

Notes and references
Notes 
  
References

External links

Aspley Heath and Woburn Sands local history site
 The Hogsty End Handbook local community magazine
Aspley Heath pages at the Bedfordshire and Luton Archives and Records Service

Villages in Bedfordshire
Civil parishes in Bedfordshire
Central Bedfordshire District